Kang Mun-bong (October 26, 1923 – February 26, 1988) was a South Korean military officer. He knew a great deal about Korean history, specifically as it pertains to the military.

Kang takes credit for lessening the North Korean army's defenses by deflecting the army to the Honam area.

He was well known and highly regarded as a hero after the Korean War. However, due to corruption and conspiracy charges, he was forced to live the final days of his life in the United States.

Early life 
He was born October 26, 1923, in Korea during the Japanese colonial period in South Hamgyong Province, which is now part of North Korea.

Career

Korean War 
In 1952, Kang became the commander of the ROK 1st Division and he achieved the rank of major general during the Korean War. Was picked by President Rhee, Seungman to attend the U.S. War College in Ft. Leavenworth, Kansas during the Korean War with General Chung, Il Kwon. He was in charge of reforming the III Corps in 1953. Kang was then trained under the US Army X Corps. When the US X Corps pulled out, Kang and his men were in charge of defending key areas in the war. They were responsible for defending the area from the Punchbowl to the Pukhan River. General Kang then formed the Second Republic of Korean Army and became its first Commanding Officer.

Trial for conspiracy 
Even though Kang played a large role in the Republic of Korean Army's general staff as their chief of operations, there was suspicion relating to his involvement in Kim Chang-Yong's assassination and other NDC corruption charges. Kang was put on trial Taegu where he was found guilty and sentenced to death. However, this sentence was changed due to his success and influence in the Korean War. He was later liberated from prison after the April Revolution. Kang never confessed to participating in the assassination of Kim Chang-Yong, regardless of the court's decision

Accomplishments 
After his liberation from prison, Kang moved to the United States and attended George Washington University for a few years.

While serving his life sentence, he wrote a book about his life called A Study on the top Korean military leadership during the Korean War which was then published in Seoul in 1983. This contains the most information about his life, but it was not widely circulated.

Death 
Kang died February 26, 1988, in Los Angeles, CA.

References

1923 births
1988 deaths
George Washington University alumni
People from South Hamgyong
South Korean emigrants to the United States
South Korean generals
South Korean Buddhists